Atrapada is a Mexican drama television series produced by Sony Pictures Television for Imagen Televisión, that premiered on 3 September 2018 and ended on 23 November 2018. The series revolves around Mariana, a beautiful young woman who becomes a professional thief after the murder of her parents. In the United States it premiered on UniMás on 21 January 2019 and ended on 23 April 2019.

Plot 
Mariana is an attractive and intelligent young woman, who is capable of seducing any man she desires. After witnessing the murder of her parents, Mariana, just a teenager, is forced to live in the streets and earn a living as a shoeshiner in order to support her younger siblings. She meets Sebastián, who turns her into a skilled white-collar thief. Years later, Mariana's life of theft takes an unexpected turn when Carlos Alberto Herrera, the head of a powerful Mexican family to which Mariana tried to trick, has kidnapped her brothers in exchange for the completion of an important mission. Mariana must infiltrate the Vargas family and seduce the two Vargas brothers to create dissension between them and finally destroy them. The mission becomes more difficult when Mariana realizes that she is falling in love with Felipe Vargas. Now, she will face the biggest challenge of her life to save her brothers. She finds herself face to face with the man who killed her parents. Mariana will not rest until she discovers the culprit of the death of her parents.

Cast

Main 
 África Zavala as Mariana Velasco/Luz Quintero
 Erick Chapa as Felipe Vargas
 Rubén Zamora as Sebastián Márquez
 Giuseppe Gamba as Alexander Vargas
 Verónica Merchant as Daniela Vargas
 Fernando Ciangherotti as Carlos Alberto Herrera
 Gabriela Roel as Amelia Herrera
 Camila Selser as Brenda Herrera
 Jaime Del Águila as Darío Herrera
 Pamela Almanza as Aurora de Vargas
 Ale Müller as Corina Herrera
 David Caro Levy as Pablo
 Alessio Valentini as Luis
 Sofía Garza as Noemí

Recurring 
 Patricia Reyes Spíndola as Marcela
 Claudette Maillé as Renata Garay
 Evelyn Cedeño as Cristina
 Miguel Ángel Biaggio as Marcos
 Ricardo Kleinbaum as Porfirio Duarte
 María José Magan as Sofía

Production 
The start of production was confirmed on October 23, 2017. The series is produced by Sony Pictures Television, written by Joaquín Gorriz and Roberto Jiménez, directed by Javier Solar and Salvador Espinosa, and produced by Marcel Ferrer. A total of 60 episodes were confirmed.

Casting 
On October 23, 2017, it was confirmed that África Zavala and Erick Chapa will be playing the main characters of the series, along with Giuseppe Gamba, Verónica Merchant and Fernando Ciangherotti.

Ratings

Mexico ratings 
 
}}

U.S. ratings 
 
}}

Episodes

References

External links 
 

2018 Mexican television series debuts
2018 Mexican television series endings
2018 telenovelas
Mexican telenovelas
Imagen Televisión telenovelas
Mexican LGBT-related television shows
Works about Mexican drug cartels
Sony Pictures Television telenovelas